HBO2 may refer to:
 Oxoborinic acid, an acid with the chemical formula 
 HBO2, an American premium cable TV channel run by HBO
 HbO2, oxyhemoglobin (Hb stands for Hemoglobin)- see Oxygen–haemoglobin dissociation curve